This is a list of characters from the American animated television series, Hi Hi Puffy AmiYumi, which was created by Sam Register, and which originally aired on Cartoon Network from November 19, 2004, to June 27, 2006.

Main

Ami Onuki (voiced by Janice Kawaye) is the drummer, depicted as the optimistic and cheerful girly girl of the group. At 16, she is often depicted as the more mature one of the group, being able to look at the bright side and finding a solution – but it is not always the case, as she sometimes can get ditzy or even protective over her own public image, as seen in "Ami's Secret" – she becomes extremely conscious in "Stop The Presses". Ami has long, cerise hair, matching eyes, a light yellow flower, an orange and yellow go-go dress and matching white go-go boots. Her hair is styled into odango buns, which both appear no matter which way she's facing. Ami gets away with things for her own needs, like greed over cute collectibles (in "Collect All 5"), taking things without permission much to Yumi's chagrin (in "Home Insecurity"), and have a cell phone addiction in "Number, Please". In spite of this, she has some upsides – she can drive the group's tour bus, which becomes part of the conflict in the episode "Driving School". While she can make a huge mess, she also can clean those up like a tornado – the episode "Neat Freak" focuses on this aspect. She also can communicate to bees and skillfully play the drums with her bare toes (as seen in "Ami Goes Bad" and "Mean Machine"). A recurring gag is that Ami seemingly has lots of strength; she can crush a handheld console in "The Legend of Mei Pie" and throw things far off and away in "Gridiron Maidens". In the episode "In Harmony's Way", Ami has a diary which she is extremely protective over. It is revealed she writes extremely mundane things in said diary (e.g. liking pastrami), much to Harmony's underwhelmed surprise. In the episode "Granny", Ami has an unnamed grandma who comes to visit the group's tour bus.
Yumi Yoshimura (voiced by Grey DeLisle) is the guitarist, depicted as the sarcastic and grumpy tomboy of the group. At 14, Yumi is more impetuous than Ami, and often rushes into a situation without thinking. Despite this, Yumi may play more of the straightman whenever Ami would act childish. She has short, blue hair with bangs swept onto her left eye, sky blue eyes, black spiked necklace and bracelets, black boots with indigo laces and stripes, and a lavender T-shirt with a skull print. The skull usually would match her current expression, otherwise it has a mind of its own. Yumi is usually fond of all things typically "rough and tough", like ninjas (to the point of being carried away as one in "Ninjcompoop"), monster trucks, and car crushers. She is able to eat a lot if she were to be bored, and would bite her nails whenever she had a lot of pressure. Yumi can also understand animals, like squirrels (as seen in "Arbor Day" – something Harmony erroneously claimed in "Dis-Harmony" as one of her fears). In "Opera Yumi", Yumi was assigned as an opera singer since birth, but quit at a very young age. She was forced to go back to said job, only to find her true passion in playing for her band. Yumi frequently would butt heads with Kaz, to the point where episodes like "Driving School" focus on their petty conflicts. She also sometimes cannot stand Ami, to the point where a microwave incident turned her into thinking she was Ami (in "Ami Ami"), desyncing Ami's routine to disastrous results, so she won't be waken up early (in "Time Off") and assumed better if the band never existed (in "Yumi Goes Solo"). The two remain on good terms throughout, with Yumi realizing she is better with Ami's presence, at the end. Yumi would never make an appearance in a Cartoon Network show after the show's cancellation until 2018, when she later appeared as a cameo in the OK K.O.! Let's Be Heroes episode "Crossover Nexus", alongside Robot Jones (from Whatever Happened to... Robot Jones?), Chowder and Shnitzel (from Chowder), Festro (from Secret Mountain Fort Awesome), Moxy (from The Moxy Show), Ilana (from Sym-Bionic Titan), High-Five Ghost (from Regular Show), and Weasel (from I Am Weasel).
Kazuo "Kaz" Harada (voiced by Keone Young) is the greedy, foolish manager of the group. In stark contrast to the girls, he has a prominent Japanese accent and resembles moreso like Puffy AmiYumi's real-life manager (of the same name) – he is a short, stout elderly man with balding gray hair, slight facial hair, large round glasses both with opaque lenses and his black eyes visible, a dark gray T-shirt and blue pants. He also resembles moreso of an exaggerated, cartoony version of Fujiko F. Fujio or Fujio Akatsuka's character designs – with large bulbous eyes and a curved end at his mouth. Kaz concocts a variety of money-grabbing schemes, much to the girls' chagrin (like in "Mini-Puffs"), or cause problems towards any of them for monetary reasons (like when he and Yumi sold Ami's diary "In Harmony's Way"). He also sometimes punishes them over minor, even misunderstood things (like in "Prisoners of Yoyovia"). When they are away, Kaz would take care of their pet cats Jang-Keng and Tekirai – however, he ends up being a frequent target to their mischief. As much as Kaz would frequently cause problems within the group throughout the series, he sometimes does actually mean well, even if it comes off as a cautionary punishment, etc.

Recurring
Jang-Keng (voiced by Grey DeLisle) and Tekirai (voiced by Janice Kawaye) are Yumi's and Ami's pet cats, respectively. Jang-Keng (sometimes called "Jengo") is a black cat, and Tekirai (called "Teki" for short) is a fluffy white cat. The girls adore their cats, appearing very friendly and appreciative, but whenever they were away, Kaz would be a constant victim of their mischief. They also have a grudge against Domo.
Harmony (voiced by Sandy Fox) is the self-proclaimed "number one fan" of the girls, and of Kaz by the end of the episode "Dis-Harmony" and in "Fan Clubs". She is a crazy six-year-old girl who is so obsessed with Ami and Yumi, that she follows them around the world, annoying the duo to no end. At the end of her first appearance, she becomes obsessed with Kaz's singing, it becomes a running gag in some episodes, appearing from nowhere and telling Kaz she is his #1 fan. When not following the group, she steals Ami's diary for herself to read, only to be baffled by the entries inside ("In Harmony's Way"). She also joins a scouting group in the episode "Junior Tapeworm", to which her specific and extreme attempts terrify the counselor.
Wall (voiced by Will Ryan) is a hulking yet slow-witted man, hired by Kaz as the girls' bodyguard. He is overprotective, pummeling anyone with whom Ami and Yumi attempt to make contact. He also speaks in the third person. Kaz later hired him as a bouncer for a party he was throwing and, more recently, Ami had him try being a roadie. He later appeared in the episode "Sound Off".
Domo (voiced by Keone Young) is Kaz's dog. He looks much like his owner, even sharing a similar style of glasses – this becomes a running gag in one episode. While people frequently mistook him for Kaz, Kaz is the only one who doesn't see the resemblance. Like his owner, he is constantly in conflict with the cats, especially since he enjoys eating their food.
The Talent Suckers are a rock trio from Transylvania, all of whom are vampires, who first appeared in the eponymous episode "sucking" Ami and Yumi's talent away from them. They returned in three other episodes later in the series. The straight man of the trio is Vlad (Nathan Carlson), a tall vampire who speaks with a Transylvanian accent. The second band member is a short vampire, Nicolai (Corey Burton), who is easily made nervous. A running gag has Vlad slapping Nicolai back to his senses. The third Talent Sucker is Mitch (also voiced by Carlson), a vampire who does not talk, but instead grunts and groans.

Minor
Eldwin Blair (voiced by Nathan Carlson) is a sinister land developer, and the antagonist in the two episodes in which he appears. He usually tries to tear down beloved places for his own selfish needs.
King Chad (voiced by Katie Leigh) is a buck-teethed teenager, who is described as "a bad boy super hunk" by Ami and Yumi. He is obsessed with the card game Stu-Pi-Doh! (a parody of Yu-Gi-Oh!) and thinks highly of himself. In "Janice Jealous", he had a girlfriend named Janice who shared his interests in video games, yo-yo tricks, and comics. True to his name, King Chad wears a fur-lined cape and gold crown, and sits on a beautifully-adorned throne.
Atchan (voiced by Rob Paulsen) is a character Ami and Yumi met at Camp Youwannasushi. He thinks he is a superhero. He is based on Vo Atsushi, the lead singer of the J-Pop band New Rote'ka – who is friends with the real-life Yumi Yoshimura and made two cameos in the series last season's live-action sequences. Atchan constantly refers to himself in the 3rd person. Before becoming a superhero, a younger Atchan resembled moreso like Mac (from Foster's Home for Imaginary Friends). After he declares himself a hero, his looks change to look more like Kamen Rider's. He has a painted star over his right eye resembling that of Kiss guitarist Paul Stanley.
Julie Hinikawa (voiced by Lara Jill Miller) is Yumi's friend who only appears in the eponymous episode, "Julie AmiYumi". She is a former band member whose signature color is green and she plays a keyboard guitar. She treats Yumi kindly, but is always mean to Ami. In the episode, she tries to take out Ami and Yumi as revenge for them stealing the stardom which she believed to be rightfully hers. She could not remember Ami's name, and calls her "Arthur" throughout. At the end, when she is standing in the rain she swore revenge. While Julie isn't based on anyone in particular, a third girl ("Emi") sung a version of "True Asia", along with the real Ami and Yumi.
Janice (voiced by Janice Kawaye) is a girl King Chad dates in "Janice Jealous". She appears stoic at first, and makes Ami and Yumi distraught. She is based on her voice actress, with Kawaye being her namesake.
Team Teen is the name of a superhero trio. The members are Jarhead (voiced by Nathan Carlson), Prom Queen, and Pizza Face. They appear in the eponymously titled episode, trying to stop Mega Bully from harassing the kids at the park. They also assigned the girls as "Pom Pom" and "The Rebel", respectively. Team Teen is a parody of the Teen Titans, another show that Puffy AmiYumi sang the theme song for (along with the fact K2G was used for an episode).
While Jarhead is the only member who can speak, he is seemingly also the leader of the team. He was particularly unhappy with how Ami and Yumi fought Mega Bully in their own way, and shames them for "using violence". Disapproving of his shameless rule enforcement, they told him to "not let their super squareness rub off on them".

References

Cartoon Network Studios characters
Lists of characters in American television animation
Hi Hi Puffy AmiYumi
Television characters introduced in 2003
Animated characters introduced in 2003